This is a list of Space Shuttle rollbacks. "Rollback" is the term NASA uses when the Space Shuttle was rolled back from the launch pad atop the mobile launcher platform and Crawler-transporter to the Vehicle Assembly Building (VAB). A variety of factors could require a rollback, from severe weather to the need for repairs that could not be performed at the launch pad. Shuttle rollbacks are listed in chronological order:

References

External links
NASA Shuttle page

Space Shuttle program